The Kentucky Wildcats men's basketball team, representing the University of Kentucky, has had 107 players drafted into the National Basketball Association (NBA) since the league began holding drafts in 1947.

Each NBA franchise seeks to add new players through an annual draft. The NBA uses a draft lottery to determine the first three picks of the NBA draft; the 14 teams that did not make the playoffs the previous year are eligible to participate. After the first three picks are decided, the rest of the teams pick in reverse order of their win–loss record. To be eligible for the NBA Draft, a player in the United States must be at least 19 years old during the calendar year of the draft and must be at least one year removed from the graduation of his high school class. From 1967 until the ABA–NBA merger in 1976, the American Basketball Association (ABA) held its own draft.

Key

Players selected

Notes

References

General

 
 
 

Specific

 
Kentucky Wildcats
Kentucky Wildcats NBA draft